The Harford Baronetcy, of Falcondale in the County of Cardigan, is a title in the Baronetage of the United Kingdom. It was created on 29 June 1934 for Major John Charles Harford.

Harford baronets, of Falcondale (1934)

Sir John Charles Harford, 1st Baronet (1860–1934)
Sir George Arthur Harford, 2nd Baronet (1897–1967)
Sir (John) Timothy Harford, 3rd Baronet (1932–2010)
Sir Mark John Harford, 4th Baronet (born 1964)

Notes

References
Kidd, Charles, Williamson, David (editors). Debrett's Peerage and Baronetage (1990 edition). New York: St Martin's Press, 1990, 

Baronetcies in the Baronetage of the United Kingdom